The Norwich Cadets women's ice hockey team represents Norwich University in Northfield, Vermont. The school's women's team competes in NCAA Division III women's ice hockey, as part of the New England Hockey Conference (NEHC). Norwich alumna Sophie Leclerc has served as head coach of the program since the 2019–20 season.

History
The 2007–08 season marked the inaugural season of the Norwich Cadets as a varsity team. Mark Bolding was named the program's first head coach and would go on to coach twelve seasons with the Cadets. Sophie Leclerc led the club with 13 goals and 27 points and ranked second for assists, with 14.

During the 2008–09 campaign, the Cadets enjoyed their first-ever ECAC East Conference Tournament championship. In the Cadets final 16 contests, they went 13–2–1, leading up to a 4–0 win over Salve Regina in the conference championship game. Four Cadets players named to the ECAC East All-Tournament team. The Cadets made their first NCAA Tournament appearance before falling to eventual runner-up Elmira 3–2 in the quarterfinals.

In the 2010 NCAA Division III Quarterfinals, Sophie Leclerc scored the game-winning goal versus Plattsburgh State with 42 seconds left. She was part of a Cadets team that lost the 2010 NCAA Final to Amherst by a 7–2 tally.

The Cadets were led by team captain Sophie Leclerc as the Cadets won their first Division III title in 2011. This was accomplished in only the fourth year of the program. The Cadets set program records in wins (25) and conference victories (17). On January 28, 2011, Julie Fortier notched the 50th goal of her career with a hat trick versus New England College as the Cadets prevailed by a 3–2 tally. In a January 29 contest versus Castleton, she became the second player in program history to record 100 points in a career with a goal in the first period.

In the Division III title game, Leclerc contributed with two goals and an assist, as the Cadets defeated the RIT Tigers by a 5–2 mark. Her 54 points led the nation in scoring, while teammate Julie Fortier’s 45 points ranked second nationally (Fortier’s 23 goals tied a career high). Leclerc was featured in the April 4, 2011 issue of Sports Illustrated as part of its Faces in the Crowd section.

On December 4, 2011, Julie Fortier became the Cadets all-time goal-scoring leader as the Cadets logged a 5–0 victory over Holy Cross in Worcester, Massachusetts. Fortier contributed with two goals and a helper. With Norwich leading by a 1–0 tally, Fortier notched the 73rd goal of her career to surpass Sophie Leclerc.

On January 6, 2012, team captain Melissa Rundlett became just the third Norwich player in program history to reach 100 career points. She registered a goal and two assists to help the Cadets best Saint Michael's by a 9–0 mark. At the 5:36 mark of the first period, she assisted on Renee Lortie’s goal for the 99th career point. She would reach the milestone by scoring her seventh goal of the season at the 17:09 mark of the first period. Said goal gave Norwich a 5–0 advantage.

After twelve successful seasons, in which he amassed a 266-68-22 record, head coach Mark Bolding stepped down to accept the head coaching position with the Yale Bulldogs women's ice hockey program. The following month, on May 17, 2019, Sophie Leclerc was announced as the second head coach in program history.

Season by season record

Source: USCHO; NCAA, NEHC

Awards and honors
Mark Bolding, American Hockey Coaches Association (AHCA) National "Coach of the Year" (2009–10)
Mark Bolding, American Hockey Coaches Association (AHCA) National "Coach of the Year" (2010–11)
 Julie Fortier, ECAC East Division III Women’s Player of the Week (Week of November 14, 2011)
 Julie Fortier, ECAC East Division III Women’s Player of the Week (Week of November 21, 2011)
 Julie Fortier, 2012 Laura Hurd Award Winner
 Amanda Conway, 2020 Laura Hurd Award Winner  
 Emily Lambert, 2020 College Sports Information Directors of America (CoSIDA) Academic All-American At-Large First Team  
Sophie Leclerc, 2007–08 ECAC East Second team
Sophie Leclerc, 2008–09 ECAC East Second team
Sophie Leclerc, 2008–09 ECAC East Tournament Most Outstanding Player
Sophie Leclerc, 2008–09 ECAC East All-Tournament team
Sophie Leclerc, 2009–10 NCAA Division III All-Tournament team
Sophie Leclerc, 2009–10 New England Division II-III All-Star
Sophie Leclerc, 2009–10 ECAC East Second Team selection
Sophie Leclerc, 2010–11 ECAC East scoring champion
Sophie Leclerc, 2010–11 ECAC Division III Player of the year
Sophie Leclerc, 2010–11 Division III AHCA All-America selection.
 Amanda Wilks, 2008–09 Division III AHCA All-America selection

References

College women's ice hockey teams in the United States
Ice Hockey, Women's
Ice hockey teams in Vermont
Women's sports in Vermont